Homo luzonensis, also locally called "Ubag" after a mythical caveman, is an extinct, possibly pygmy, species of archaic human from the Late Pleistocene of Luzon, the Philippines. Their remains, teeth and phalanges, are known only from Callao Cave in the northern part of the island dating to before 50,000 years ago. They were initially identified as belonging to modern humans in 2010, but in 2019, after the discovery of more specimens, they were placed into a new species based on the presence of a wide range of traits similar to modern humans as well as to Australopithecus and early Homo.

Their ancestors, who may have been Asian H. erectus or some other even earlier Homo, would have needed to have made a sea crossing of several miles at minimum to reach the island. Human presence on Luzon dates to at latest 771,000 to 631,000 years ago. The inhabitants of the cave dragged in mainly Philippine deer carcasses, and used tools for butchering.

Taxonomy

The first remains were discovered in 2007 in Callao Cave in Northern Luzon, the Philippines. In 2010, French anthropologist Florent Détroit and Filipino archaeologist Armand Mijares and colleagues identified them as belonging to modern humans. In 2019, after the discovery of 12 new specimens and based on the apparent presence of both modern-humanlike and primitive Australopithecus-like features, they reassigned the remains (and other hominin findings from the cave) to a new species, Homo luzonensis, the specific name deriving from the name of the island.

The holotype, CCH6, comprises the upper right premolars and molars. The paratypes are: CCH1, a right third metatarsal bone of the foot; CCH2 and CCH5, two phalanges of the fingers; CCH3 and CCH4, two phalanges of the foot; CCH4, a left premolar; and CCH9, a right third molar. CCH7 represents a juvenile femoral shaft. These represent at least three individuals. The specimens are kept at the National Museum of the Philippines, Manila.

The exact taxonomic placement of H. luzonensis is unknown, and, like for other tropical hominins, DNA extraction failed. It is possible that—like what is hypothesized for H. floresiensis from Flores, Indonesia—H. luzonensis descended from an early H. erectus dispersal across Southeast Asia. It is also possible that these two insular archaic humans descend from an entirely different Homo species possibly earlier than H. erectus. The bones were dated to before 50,000 years ago, and there is evidence of hominin activity on the island as early as 771,000 – 631,000 years ago.

Anatomy

Like other endemic fauna on Luzon, as well as H. floresiensis, H. luzonensis may have shrunk in size due to insular dwarfism. However, more complete remains are needed to verify size. Much like H. floresiensis, H. luzonensis presents a number of characteristics more similar to Australopithecus and early Homo than to modern humans and more recent Homo.

The teeth of H. luzonensis are small and mesiodistally (the length between the two ends of the tooth) shortened. The molars are smaller than those of H. floresiensis. Like other recent Homo and modern humans, the molars decrease in size towards the back of the mouth, and the enamel-dentin juncture lacks well defined wavy crenulations. The enamel-dentine juncture is most similar to that of Asian H. erectus. The premolars are oddly large compared to the molars, with more similar proportions to Paranthropus than any other Homo, though H. luzonensis postcanine teeth differ greatly from those of Paranthropus in size and shape. H. luzonensis premolars share many characteristics with those of Australopithecus, Paranthropus, and early Homo.

The finger bones are long, narrow, and curved, which is seen in Australopithecus, H. floresiensis, and sometimes modern humans. They are dorso-palmarly (from the palm to the back of the hand) compressed, and have well developed flexor sheath attachment, which are seen in Australopithecus and the early H. habilis. Unique to H. luzonensis, the dorsal beak near the knuckle was strongly developed and angled towards the wrist rather than the finger. The foot bones are morphologically unique among Homo, and are more or less indistinguishable from those of A. africanus and A. afarensis. Australopithecus limbs are generally interpreted as being adaptations for bipedalism and potentially suspensory behavior in the trees, but the fragmentary record of H. luzonensis limits extrapolation of locomotory behavior.

Culture

Because Luzon has always been an island in the Quaternary, the ancestors of H. luzonensis would have had to have made a substantial sea crossing over the Huxley Line.

About 90% of the bone fragments from Callao Cave belong to the Philippine deer, which suggests that deer carcasses were periodically brought into the cave. With the exception of Palawan (where there were tigers), there is no evidence of large carnivores ever inhabiting the Philippines during the Pleistocene, which attributes these remains to human activity. The Philippine warty pig and an extinct bovid were also present. There are cut marks on a deer tibia, and a lack of tools in the cave could either have resulted from the use of organic material for tools rather than stone, or the processing of meat away from the cave.

The Minori Cave, in the Cagayan Valley of northern Luzon  (excavated much earlier) yielded an almost complete skeleton of a rhino (the extinct Nesorhinus philippinensis), which had been butchered dating to 771–631,000 years ago. In 1981, six lithic cores, forty-nine lithic flakes, and two hammerstones, were found at Minori Cave, which are similar to the chert industry from the Lower Paleolithic Arubo 1 site in central Luzon. Also present were the remains of the elephant Stegodon, the Philippine deer, freshwater turtles, and monitor lizards.

See also

References

External links

 
 

Hominini
Early species of Homo
Paleontology in the Philippines
Prehistory of the Philippines
History of Cagayan
2007 archaeological discoveries
Fossil taxa described in 2019